Rachel Susan Rowe (born 13 September 1992) is a Welsh professional footballer who plays as a forward for the Wales national team and FA Women's Super League club Reading.

She began her senior career with Cardiff City before joining Swansea City in 2013. After two seasons, she joined Reading in February 2015, initially combining her playing career with a job in the prison service. She turned professional later the same year after helping the club win promotion to the FA Women's Super League. She made her international debut for Wales in 2017.

Early life
Rowe lived in Swansea, Wales where she began playing football at a young age. Her father suffered from alcoholism and she later commented that their "relationship deteriorated" due to his drinking before his death when Rowe was 21. She took a job at HM Prison Swansea as an operational support guard and later fulfilled the same role at HM Prison Cardiff. The role included performing vehicle checks and escorting contractors onto prison wings to perform maintenance work. She later enrolled on a business management course provided by the Welsh Government.

Club career
Rowe initially played for a local boys youth team but later stated that "nobody wanted to play with me". She was spotted by a scout from Swansea City Ladies and played for the club's youth academy. However, she began her senior career with the club's local rivals Cardiff City and won the inaugural Welsh Premier Women's Football League title during the 2012–13 season, scoring in their decisive 5–2 victory over Wrexham in the final game of the season. She returned to Swansea during the summer window soon after. However, she suffered a broken leg while playing against her former team during the first half of the following campaign.

In February 2015, Rowe joined WSL 2 side Reading with assistant manager Kelly Chambers describing her as possessing "an abundance of competiveness along with her pace, strength and work rate". Despite the move, Rowe remained semi-professional during her first year, making the 300-mile round trip from her home in Swansea to training three times every week while remaining in her job with the prison service. In December 2015, she signed a professional contract with Reading following the club's promotion to FA Women's Super League. Following promotion, Rowe converted to playing as a full-back for a period, having originally joined the club as a winger.

At the start of the 2018–19 season, she featured in a 1–0 victory over Liverpool. However, the following month, she suffered an anterior cruciate ligament injury in a friendly match that ended her season after a single appearance. Despite her injury setback, she was offered a new contract with the club at the end of the campaign. On 7 November 2020, Rowe played her 100th game for Reading.

In March 2021, Rowe signed a new three-year contract with Reading.

International career

Having previously represented Wales at under-17 and under-19 level, Rowe made her debut for the senior side in Wales' first UEFA Women's Euro 2017 qualifying match against Austria starting in a 3–0 defeat in Sankt Pölten. She made her international debut despite still working within the prison service.

Career statistics

Club

International goals

Honours 
Individual

 FA Women's Super League Goal of the Month: October 2022

References

External links

 
 

1992 births
Living people
Reading F.C. Women players
Wales women's international footballers
Welsh women's footballers
Women's Super League players
Women's association football wingers
Women's association football forwards
Cardiff City Ladies F.C. players
Swansea City Ladies F.C. players